The African Human Rights Law Reports is an annual law journal published by JUTA Law on behalf of the Centre for Human Rights at the University of Pretoria. It contains legal decisions of relevance to human rights law in Africa. These include selected domestic decisions from the whole continent, as well as the decisions of the African Commission on Human and Peoples' Rights and the United Nations treaty bodies, dealing with African countries. It is published in English and French and is indexed in the International Bibliography of the Social Sciences.

External links 
 

Law journals
Human rights journals
Annual journals
Multilingual journals
Publications established in 2001
University of Pretoria